Abère is a commune in the Pyrénées-Atlantiques department in the Nouvelle-Aquitaine region in southwestern France.

Geography

Location
Abère is located some 22 km northeast of Pau and some 9 km northeast of Morlaas. The D7 road (Route de Vic) heading east from Saint-Jammes passes through the southern portion of the commune and continues to Baleix. Access to the village is by the Chemin de Lapoutge going north from the D7 for about 6 km. The Highway D207 coming south from Simacourbe forms the eastern boundary of the commune. The commune is mostly farmland with forests in the north and east

Hydrography
Located in the watershed of the Adour, the Grand Léez river forms the western border of the commune, with the Arriutort joining it at the northern tip of the commune and forming the northeastern border of the commune.

Localities and hamlets

Bartot
Berducq
Bordenave
Briscoulet
Courde
Crouquet
Hourcade
Labat
Larré
Piarrette
Salabert
La Teulère

Neighbouring communes and towns

Toponymy
The name Abère was mentioned in the tenth century (according to Pierre de Marca) and appeared in the forms:
Oere and Bere (1385 Census of Béarn),
Vere and Avere (1385 Census of Morlaàs, but uncertain if it is the same locality),
Oeyre was mentioned in 1487 Registry of Béarnais businesses.
Abere appears on the Cassini Map of 1750 and in the 1790 map, Bulletin of Laws.

Michel Grosclaude  proposed a Latin etymology of abellana or abella, derived from the Béarnais abera (according to Brigitte Jobbé-Duval.), which means "hazelnut" and by extension "the hazel copse"

The commune's name in Béarnais is Avera.

History
Paul Raymond noted that in 1385, there were 8 fires in Abère and that it depended on the bailiwick of Pau. A barony was created in 1672, a vassal of the Viscounts of Béarn. The commune was part of the Archdiocese of Vic-Bihl, which in turn depended on the Diocese of Lescar of which Lembeye was the capital.

Its Lay Abbey,  the house of Bosom d'Abadie is mentioned in 1385.

Administration

List of Successive Mayors of Abère

Intercommunality
Abère is a member of three inter-communal organisations:
the community of communes of Nord-Est Béarn
the AEP Union for the Luy and Gabas Regions
the energy Union of the Pyrénées-Atlantiques

Population

Culture and Heritage

Civil heritage
Several structures are listed as historical monuments in the commune. These are:
Tile factory at la Teulère
Former Lay Abbey: the Bosom d'Abadie
Town Hall (former Presbytery) (19th century)
Chateau of Bordenave d'Abère (1732)
Menyucq House farm (1841)
Houses and Farms (19th century)

Religious Heritage
The Church of St. John the Baptist (16th century) The church contains several historical objects. These are:
Processional Cross (17th century)
Altar Cross
Painting: Christ on the Cross with Saint John, the Virgin, and Saint John the Baptist (18th century)
Baptismal Fonts (12th century)
4 Altar Candlesticks
2 statues: Angels holding a column and a scale
Tabernacle
Altar (18th century)
Altar, Tabernacle, and 4 Candlesticks at the secondary altar

See also
Communes of the Pyrénées-Atlantiques department

References

External links
Abère on Géoportail, National Geographic Institute (IGN)  website 
Abere on the 1750 Cassini Map

Communes of Pyrénées-Atlantiques